The Original Glasgow derby is the name for the old rivalry between crosstown Scottish football clubs Queen's Park and Rangers, both based in Glasgow. The two clubs, alongside Celtic, are two of the most successful in the Scottish Cup, and the rivalry between them was one of the more intense in the early years of Scottish football, before being overtaken by the Old Firm rivalry from the 1900s onwards. The highest Scottish Cup attendance figure for the fixture was recorded on 18 January 1930 at Hampden Park for the first round, when 95,722 fans attended. The two clubs met in the top flight for last time during 1957–58, the final season before Queen's Park's relegation. The club retained their amateur status from their foundation in 1867 until 2019, which meant it was extremely difficult to compete at the highest level and the intensity of the derby dramatically declined after 1958 as the Spiders never returned to the top tier.

On 20 October 2012, the old derby was revived again in league football after 54 years in the Scottish Third Division following Rangers' expulsion from the top flight in 2012 – the attendance figure for their first meeting was a world record for a fourth division match at the time as 49,463 fans were present at Ibrox Stadium to see fourth placed Rangers overcome early leaders Queen's Park 2–0. Their first league fixture at Hampden since 1958 took place 29 December 2012, attracting 30,117 fans. This was the first five-figure attendance Queen’s Park had recorded for 29 years and would have been higher if the stadium was not operating at reduced capacity due to upgrading work on the North Stand.

Queen's Park and Rangers have played each other 107 times in all major competitions (and over 100 times more in minor and wartime competitions): Rangers have won 79 matches, Queen's Park 11 matches, and 17 ended in a draw.

History

Early years 1875–1900
A match between the two clubs officially came to records in an 1875 friendly to raise money for the victims of a huge fire in Bridgeton that had claimed many lives. After meeting in the final of the inaugural Glasgow Merchants Charity Cup in 1877, the first major competitive fixture between the sides was a 1878–79 Scottish Cup quarter-final tie on 22 March 1879 at the first Hampden Park with Rangers winning 1–0 and advancing to the semifinal. That game was nine years before Celtic even came into existence. In the 1879–80 season Queen's Park recorded their largest victory against their rivals in a Cup replay, dominating the match 5–1 on 27 September 1879 at the first Hampden in front of 5,000 spectators. The first match finished in a 0–0 draw a week earlier at Rangers' home at Kinning Park, in front of 7,000 fans. Two years later on 30 September 1882 Queen's Park would beat their rivals again by 3-2 in second round of the Scottish Cup at the first Hampden.

In 1890 Rangers were part of the inaugural league season in Scottish football and Queen's Park joined the league 10 years later in 1900, remaining there with some interruptions until 1958. But between 1895 and 1899 and the two clubs would face each other in the Glasgow Football League: Rangers won the title in 1896 and 1898 and Queen's Park in 1897. They also played against each other in the Glasgow Cup: in 1898 Rangers beat Queen's Park 4–0 in the final and the next year the Spiders took their revenge winning the local trophy with a narrow 1–0 victory.

Queen's Park started competing in the Scottish Cup from its first edition in 1873–74 and proved the most successful team for the first three decades of Scottish football, winning the trophy 10 times. That success instantly made the Spiders one of the best supported football clubs in Glasgow. Rangers started competing in the Scottish Cup in 1874–75 which for a second consecutive time finished with Queen's Park as the winners. The latter won the cup for the last time in 1893, beating Celtic in the final. On the other hand the Gers won it for first time the following year in 1894, overcoming Queen's Park in the semi-final after a replay, though it took them until 1948 to reach 11 wins and surpass their old rivals' record (Celtic had done so by 1925).

Division One 1900–1939
From 1900 until 1939 the two teams would play every year against each other in the Scottish League Division One – with the exception of the 1922–23 when Queen's Park competed in the second division. Their first meeting in the top flight took place at Ibrox Park on 29 September 1900, with Rangers winning the match 3–2 in front of 16,000 spectators. On 22 October 1904 Rangers recorded their largest victory at the time beating their rivals home 5–0 in the league. Nevertheless in the 1907–08 season Queen's Park held Rangers to a 1–1 draw on 30 September 1907 in the first tied league game between the two, and on 2 November 1907 they won 3–1 at Ibrox for a first ever league victory in the derby.

After many years without a derby win Queen's Park would succeed with a victorious away performance on 10 March 1926 with a 2–1 scoreline, just their fourth league derby win at the time. They reached the semi-finals of the Scottish Cup in 1928 but lost 2–1 to holders Celtic at Ibrox; they would have faced Rangers in the final, but instead it was an Old Firm affair (the Gers won 4–0 to lift the trophy for the first time since 1903, the 25-year hiatus being almost as lengthy as that of Queen's Park at the time). They did meet in the 1932 Glasgow Cup final which attracted 50,000 fans to the stadium in a match that the Gers won easily, 3–0. The 1938–39 season was the last one before World War II with Rangers winning the title and Queen's Park finishing at the bottom of the table – but they were never relegated as there was no official football action the following year.

Wartime 1939–1946
During the World War II the two clubs faced each other in the 1939–40 Scottish War Emergency League, the Southern Football League, and the Southern Football League Cup from 1940 until 1946; Rangers won all three trophies several times. The league cup tournament was divided in groups of four and the two rivals met in the 1944–45 season when they faced each other in the semifinal match at Hampden which Rangers won 3–0 on 21 April 1945 in front of 70,000 spectators. They also met in the Summer Cup.

Post-war 1946–1958
In 1946 the football action resumed officially but Queen's Park were relegated for a second time in its history in 1948. The Original Glasgow derby was resumed eight years later in the 1956–57 season with Queen's Park returning to the highest tier and playing in a memorable battle with Rangers which ended in a 6–4 victory for the Govan side, who went on to win the title. The last season the two teams competed in the top flight was in 1957–58 with Queen's Park finishing bottom of the table and Rangers as runners-up. This was Alex Ferguson's debut campaign with Queen's Park, and he would later join Rangers in 1967.

1958–1992 decline
Following Queen's Park's relegation the derby lost its importance as Glasgow's biggest derby after the Old Firm. Their next meeting was in 1973–74 season when Rangers achieved their biggest victory ever against the Spiders: 8–0. On 12 March 1983, the Gers won narrowly 2–1 at Hampden Park in the quarter-finals of the Scottish Cup in front of 13,716 fans. The two rivals still faced each other in the increasingly irrelevant Glasgow Cup during the 1980s. Their last meeting prior to Rangers' 2012 removal from the top tier took place on 20 August 1991 in the Scottish League Cup when they beat Queen's Park 6–0 at Ibrox in the second round of the competition in front of a crowd of 32,230 fans.

2012–13 revival
In 2012, Rangers endured financial difficulties, and its holding company was liquidated in 2012. Subsequently, the team had to apply for entry to the bottom (fourth) tier of the Scottish league, eventually climbing to the top division in four seasons. That development meant that the two old rivals would be in the same division for the first time since the 1957–58 season. Both of the teams were fighting for promotion in the 2012–13 Scottish Third Division. Another historical local club, Clyde, was part of the league in that season bringing in a glimpse of the glorious past of Glaswegian football. On 29 December 2012 Queen's Park came very close to their first draw against the Gers in 70 years (since the 1932-33 season), but Fraser Aird scored on the 92nd minute to give Rangers the victory with 0-1 at Hampden Park. Overall, Rangers won all four games against Queen's Park, finishing as champions while the Spiders qualified for the play-offs but failed to win promotion in the end.

2014–15 League Cup
On 26 August 2014 Queen's Park hosted Rangers in the first round of the 2014–15 Scottish League Cup at the Excelsior Stadium in Airdrie (Hampden was being used for the 2014 Commonwealth Games at the time). That season Rangers were competing just one division higher than their opponents as they attempted to climb back through the levels of Scottish football. They managed to beat Queen's Park 2–1 and advanced to the semi-final, where they lost to Celtic. This is the most recent senior meeting between the clubs; Queen's Park have since played Rangers Reserves in the modern format of the Glasgow Cup.

Honours

All-time head-to-head record
Updated on 17 December 2020

Defunct minor competitions
There are a number of matches between the two clubs that are not recognised in the official records.

Wartime competitions
During the Second World War, the Scottish Football League and Scottish Cup were suspended and in their place unofficial regional league competitions were set up and they were mostly dominated by Rangers.

Biggest wins

Queen's Park
League
 Rangers 1–3 Queen's Park on 29 October 1927

Scottish Cup
 Queen's Park 5–1 Rangers on 27 September 1879

Scottish League Cup
Queen's Park have never beaten Rangers in the Scottish League Cup

Glasgow Cup 
 Rangers 0–3 Queen's Park on 7 November 1891
 Rangers 0–3 Queen's Park on 15 September 1906

Rangers
League 
 Rangers 7–1 Queen's Park on 20 November 1909
 Queen's Park 0–6 Rangers on 28 February 1914

Scottish Cup
 Rangers 8–0 Queen's Park on 26 January 1974

League Cup
 Rangers 6–0 Queen's Park on 20 August 1991

Glasgow Cup
 Rangers 7–1 Queen's Park on 14 October 1968

Match with most goals
 Queen's Park 4–6 Rangers on 22 April 1957, Scottish Football League

Attendances
The highest ever attendance between the two old rivals was recorded in the first round of the 1929–30 Scottish Cup on 18 January 1930 at Hampden Park: 95,722 spectators were present. One year earlier, on 12 January 1929 the Original Glasgow derby attracted 60,000 who watched Rangers beat Queen's Park 4–0. On 21 April 1945, in a Southern League Cup semi-final during wartime, 70,000 flocked to the Celtic Park to watch Rangers beat Queen's Park 3–0 to advance to the final. In total, in at least nine games, the attendance was between 40,000 and 95,000, the most recent being in 2013 in the Scottish Third Division: on 20 October 2012, 49,463 fans revived the atmosphere of the old derby at Ibrox Stadium, a figure that at the time was a world record for a fourth division match. When the two teams met in the 1973–74 Scottish Cup, their first cup meeting in 20 years Rangers easily beat second-tier Queen's Park at Hampden, still attracting 19,000 fans to the national stadium to watch the game.

Highest attendances

Individual records

Highest goalscorers
As of end of the 2019–20 season. Including Southern league.
 League games onlyQueen's Park topscorer was James McAlpine with 5 goals (1919-1934).

Finals
The two old rivals have met in several final and semifinal games, from 1877 until 1957.

Scottish Cup

The Scottish Cup was first played in 1874 and Queen's Park were the inaugural winners, lifting 10 trophies between 1874 and 1893. Their decision to stick with amateurism and not turn professional meant that more success in the competition was impossible to come by. Nevertheless, it was over 40 years later, in 1936, that Rangers equalled the Spiders''' record (Celtic overtook it in 1925). The two clubs never played against each other in a final but they clashed in three semi-finals: Rangers beat Queen's Park to advance to the final in 1879, 1894 (in a replay) and in 1933 (after two replays).

Glasgow Cup

Rangers beat Queen's Park in the finals of 1898, 1932, 1940 and 1985. On the other hand Queen's Park won the 1899 final against their rivals. In total, Rangers won 44 trophies and the Spiders 4, with their last one being in 1946.

Glasgow Merchants Charity Cup

Queen's Park were also the first ever winners of the Glasgow Merchants Charity Cup in 1877. They beat Rangers in the final on their first five meetings in 1877, 1878, 1880, 1881 and 1883. The next final they faced each other was in 1906. Rangers won that and the next 8 against Queen's Park, with the last being in 1957. In the 1922-23 Glasgow Merchants Charity Cup, Queen's Park reached the final against the Gers'' though they were playing in the second division that season. Overall, Rangers lifted the trophy 32 times and Queen's Park 8. The latter were the record holders for 31 years until 1908 when Celtic won their 9th. Between 1891, the year of their last trophy and 1957 they played in 18 finals, losing all of them.

Notable players who played for both clubs

See also

 Sport in Glasgow
 Association football culture
 List of sports rivalries
 List of association football rivalries
 Sport in Scotland
 Timeline of Glasgow history

References

External links

Scotland football derbies
Queen's Park F.C.
Rangers F.C.
Association football terminology
Recurring sporting events established in 1875
1875 establishments in Scotland
Football in Glasgow